Milovan Petrovikj (born 23 January 1990 in Kavadarci) is a Macedonian footballer who plays as a central midfielder for Radnik Surdulica in the Serbian SuperLiga.

International career
He made his senior debut for Macedonia in a September 2015 European Championship qualification match against Luxembourg and has earned a total of 9 caps, scoring no goals. His final international was an October 2016 FIFA World Cup qualification match against Italy.

Honours

Rabotnički
 Macedonian First League: 2013–14
 Macedonian Football Cup: 2013–14, 2014–15

Notes

References

External links
 
 

1990 births
Living people
Sportspeople from Kavadarci
Macedonian people of Serbian descent
Association football midfielders
Macedonian footballers
North Macedonia under-21 international footballers
North Macedonia international footballers
FK Tikvesh players
FK Pobeda players
FK Rabotnički players
NK Osijek players
Sepsi OSK Sfântu Gheorghe players
Athlitiki Enosi Larissa F.C. players
FK Sutjeska Nikšić players
FK Radnik Surdulica players
Macedonian First Football League players
Croatian Football League players
Liga I players
Montenegrin First League players
Serbian SuperLiga players
Macedonian expatriate footballers
Macedonian expatriate sportspeople in Croatia
Expatriate footballers in Croatia
Macedonian expatriate sportspeople in Romania
Expatriate footballers in Romania
Macedonian expatriate sportspeople in Greece
Expatriate footballers in Greece
Macedonian expatriate sportspeople in Montenegro
Expatriate footballers in Montenegro
Macedonian expatriate sportspeople in Serbia
Expatriate footballers in Serbia